Leucadendron coriaceum, the  rosette conebush, is a flower-bearing shrub that belongs the genus Leucadendron and forms part of the fynbos. The plant is native to the Western Cape, South Africa.

Description

Distribution and habitat
The plant occurs from Napier to Riversdale.

Gallery

References

Threatened Species Programme | SANBI Red List of South African Plants
Leucadendron coriaceum (Rosette conebush)

coriaceum